Ronald Michael Watts (May 21, 1943 – November 2, 2022) was an American professional basketball player.

A 6'6" forward from Wake Forest University, Watts played in the NBA for two seasons (1965–67) as a member of the Boston Celtics.

Watts died on November 2, 2022, at the age of 79.

References

External links

College stats

1943 births
2022 deaths
Basketball players from Washington, D.C.
Boston Celtics draft picks
Boston Celtics players
Forwards (basketball)
Seattle SuperSonics expansion draft picks
Wake Forest Demon Deacons men's basketball players
American men's basketball players